Urban Music Fest (often abbreviated as "AUMF") is a two-day, national and local entertainment stage hosting, family-centric event that occurs in Austin, Texas, during the Clyde Littlefield Texas Relays. The festival features stages that focus specifically on R&B, jazz, indie soul, gospel / neo soul, and showcases local and unsigned artists. 

The Festival also reaches out to the youth (ages 12 - 21) in the Austin area - teaching them the music industry through a non profit organization known as SoulTree Collective. SoulTree Collective was established a year after the Festival, and its participants are trained to perform on stage at the Festival - providing quality entertainment to festival goers who in turn get to witness the newest crop of Urban Music artists each year. 

This festival was not held in 2020.

References

Festivals in Austin, Texas